George Lowther may refer to:

George Lowther (pirate) (died 1723), English pirate
George Lowther (writer) (1913–1975), American writer, producer, director for radio and television
George Lowther (died 1716), Irish Member of Parliament for Ratoath
George Lowther (1739–1784), Irish Member of Parliament for Ratoath, Ardee and Newtownards
George W. Lowther (1822–1898), Massachusetts state representative and civil rights activist

See also
 Gorges Lowther (disambiguation)